Dalla Bussola is an album by Italian singer Mina, including a concert on September 16, 1972, at the Bussola nightclub in Tuscany. The album was distributed back-to-back with the album Altro.

On April 3, 2012, EMI issued a limited box with the CD plus a DVD of the concert. In the CD, a medley of songs ("Non credere", "E se domani", "Insieme", "Bugiardo e incosciente", "Parole parole", "Io e te da soli") that was absent in the first edition of the release was added.

Track listing

1972 live albums
Mina (Italian singer) live albums
Italian-language live albums